The 1977 TAA Formula Ford Driver to Europe Series was an Australian motor racing competition open to Formula Ford racing cars. The series, which was the eighth national series for Formula Fords to be held in Australia, was won by John Smith driving a Bowin P4a.

Schedule
The series was contested over eight rounds.

Results

References

TAA Formula Ford Driver to Europe Series
Australian Formula Ford Series